Xenocarida (from the Greek for strange shrimp) is a proposed clade inside the subphylum Crustacea that comprises two classes that were discovered in the 20th century: Remipedia and Cephalocarida. The clade was recovered as the sister groups to Hexapoda (including insects).

However, other studies do not recover Xenocarida as a monophyletic group and variously find Branchiopoda or Remipedia as the hexapod sister group

References

Crustacean taxonomy
Protostome unranked clades